The F Club (later known as Fan Club) was a punk rock and post-punk club night in Leeds that ran between 1977 and 1982. It was held at various venues across the city during its tenure, including Leeds Polytechnic, the Ace of Clubs, the Continental Club and Brannigan's. In Karl and Beverley Spracklen's book The Evolution of Goth Culture it was described as the space "where gothic rock was born in the form it is now". The club was foundational in the emergence of the goth subculture and led to other high profile clubs in the scene, such as the Batcave. It was frequented by members of many influential post-punk and gothic rock groups such as the Sisters of Mercy, Gang of Four, The March Violets, New Model Army and Southern Death Cult.

History

Concert promoter John Keenan set up the first F Club night in an available commonroom in Leeds Polytechnic in 1977. At the time, club membership cost £1. While here, it hosted performances by acts such as The Slits, XTC, Slaughter & the Dogs and The Psychedelic Furs. However by the end of the summer it was forced to relocate to the Ace of Clubs in Woodhouse. While here, the night was host to groups such as Joy Division, Siouxsie and The Banshees, the Mekons and Gang of Four. In 1978, it moved once again to the Continental Club in Chapeltown, where it hosted the Cure. During this period, performances were less frequent due Eddy Morrison's white power skinheads bringing performances by many non-nationalist groups to a halt. This led to frequent altercations between the attendees of the club and the far-right. Eventually, it relocated to the basement of Brannigan's on the corner of Call Lane and Lower Briggate, where it changed its name to Fan Club, due to a Levellers leaflet claiming the "F" stood for "fascist". It was here that Andrew Eldritch and Gary Marx, who would go on to be the founding lineup of The Sisters of Mercy first met. In 1981, The March Violets played their first performance at the venue, followed by the Sisters of Mercy's first performance. Bands such as Soft Cell, New Model Army, The Danse Society, Skeletal Family and Southern Death Cult also formed at the club during this period.

On the third and fourth of October 2007, the New Roscoe hosted thirtieth anniversary performance for the club. On 12 October 2012 Brudenell Social Club hosted 35th anniversary concert headlined by Penetration with support from Expelaires and Knife Edge reforming for the occasion. On 18 August 2018, the Brudenell Social Club hosted forty-first anniversary reunion show for the former members of the club.

References

Goth subculture
Goth venues
Post-punk
Music venues completed in 1977
Music venues in Leeds
1977 establishments in England
Underground punk scene in the United Kingdom
Punk rock venues
Club nights